The Winter Melon Tale  (Traditional Chinese: 大冬瓜, translated literally into Big Winter Melon) is a TVB costume drama series broadcast in March 2009.

Synopsis
Fan Tung (Liu Kai Chi) is one of the four deities under the Stove God. He has offended the Queen Mother of the West of being ravenous and gets imprisoned for 500 years in the winter melon. By chance Tin Dai Kwai (Sunny Chan) and his wife Chung Bik Yuk (Louisa So) free him from constraint. Tung gets flattened by Kwai's older brother Tin Tai Fu (also played by Liu Kai Chi) accidentally and his spirit enters Fu's body inexplicably while losing all his instincts.

Tung starts living in Kwai's house and getting closer to the family. Yuk finds Tung suspicious and she tries to unmask him by all means. Having failed in his attempt to return to Heaven, Tung becomes reliant on the help of six little deities who assimilated his instincts released from the melon, and since then Tung is aware of the fickleness of human nature. One day, Fu's truant wife Ling Fung (Lau Yuk Chui) suddenly returns. She ruins everything and even causes the death of Kwai. In order to get his life back, Tung illicitly breaks into the netherworld.

Cast

Peasants

Gods and Monsters

Viewership ratings

References

External links
TVB.com The Winter Melon Tale - Official Website 

TVB dramas
Television series set in the Western Han dynasty
2009 Hong Kong television series debuts
2009 Hong Kong television series endings